The Voice Kids is a Dutch television program produced by Talpa Productions and is broadcast on RTL 4. It is based on The Voice of Holland. Participation is only open to children between the ages of eight and fourteen.

The first season aired between 27 January and 23 March 2012. It was presented by Martijn Krabbé and Wendy van Dijk. The coaching was done by Angela Groothuizen, Marco Borsato, and Nick & Simon. The winner was Fabiënne Bergmans from Team Angela

The Blind Auditions
Four judges/coaches, all noteworthy recording artists, choose teams of contestants through a blind audition process. Each judge has the length of the auditioner's performance (about ninety seconds) to decide if he or she wants that singer on his or her team. If two or more judges want the same singer (as happens frequently), the singer has the final choice of coach.

The Blind Auditions, Part 1

The Blind Auditions, Part 2

The Blind Auditions, Part 3

The Blind Auditions, Part 4

The Blind Auditions, Part 5

The Battles
In the second stage, called the battle phase, coaches have three of their team members battle against each other directly by singing the same song together, with the coach choosing which team member to advance from each of individual "battles" into the Sing-Off stage.

 – Battle Winner
 – Eliminated

The Sing-Off 
Each coach brought his or her team after the "Battle" back to five acts, but there were only two candidates to the final. All five contestants will battle each other in "The Sing-Off", where they re-sung their audition song. The coaches then selected two of the five contestants to move to the live finals.

 – Chosen as Finalist
 – Eliminated

Live

Teams 
  Winner
  Runner-up
  Third place
  Finalist

Show

Competition Performances

Non-Competition performance

Celebrity performance

Results 
Selecting the three finalists was based on two aspects, voting by the three coaches and televoting by viewers at home. Both the coaches and the public each had up to one-hundred points to give to their favorite finalist.

Finale 
Channah, Lieke, and Melissa were immediately eliminated. Then were the finalists Dave, Fabiënne, and Vajèn.

Viewing Figures

Discography

Albums 

|-
|align="left"|The Voice Kids - The songs||02-03-2012||-||||||

Songs 

|-
|align="left"|A-Team||27-01-2012||-|||||| by Fabiënne Bergmans /Nr. 13 in the Single Top 100
|-
|align="left"|The climb||17-02-2012||-|||||| by Vajèn van den Bosch /Nr. 10 in the Single Top 100
|-
|align="left"|Jar of hearts||03-02-2012||-|||||| by Melissa Meewisse /Nr. 48 in the Single Top 100
|-
|align="left"|Geef mij je angst||27-01-2012||-|||||| by Dave Dekker /Nr. 95 in the Single Top 100
|-
|align="left"|A moment like this||23-03-2012||-|||||| by Melissa Meewisse /Nr. 75 in the Single Top 100
|-
|align="left"|Show me heaven||23-03-2012||-|||||| by Vajèn van den Bosch /Nr. 26 in the Single Top 100
|-
|align="left"|Toen ik je zag||23-03-2012||-|||||| by Dave Dekker /Nr. 24 in the Single Top 100
|-
|align="left"|What you're made of||23-03-2012||07-04-2012||38||2|| by Fabiënne Bergmans /Nr. 5 in the Single Top 100

Trivia
All episodes of The Voice Kids were recorded in studio 1 in Aalsmeer.
Early November 2011: the enrollment had closed because there were already 17,000 applications.
Before the start of The Voice Kids was on 25 January 2012, there was a press conference of the coaches. The interviewers were 24 students from different schools, so that a report could write their school.

International adaptations

References 

2012 Dutch television seasons
Netherlands